Mélodie d'amour may refer to:

"Mélodie d'amour" (Kaoma song), a 1990 single by Kaoma
"Melodie d'Amour", English version by the Ames Brothers of "Maladie d'amour" by Henri Salvador
"Mélodie d'amour", song by George Baker Selection composed by J. Bouwens 1973
"Ma mélodie d'amour", song by Mireille Mathieu 1976